"Peg o' My Heart" is a popular song first published in 1913. The title may also refer to:

Peg o' My Heart (play), a successful comedy written by J. Hartley Manners. It had three film adaptations:
Peg o' My Heart (1919 film), directed by William C. deMille starring Wanda Hawley (never released because of legal matters)
Peg o' My Heart (1922 film), directed by King Vidor
Peg o' My Heart (1933 film), featuring Marion Davies